Francisco Menocal (born 3 December 1945) is a Nicaraguan sprinter. He competed in the 400 metres at the 1968 Summer Olympics and the 1972 Summer Olympics.

References

1945 births
Living people
Athletes (track and field) at the 1968 Summer Olympics
Athletes (track and field) at the 1972 Summer Olympics
Athletes (track and field) at the 1976 Summer Olympics
Nicaraguan male sprinters
Nicaraguan male middle-distance runners
Olympic athletes of Nicaragua
Sportspeople from Managua
Central American Games silver medalists for Nicaragua
Central American Games bronze medalists for Nicaragua
Central American Games medalists in athletics